Michael Blouin is a Canadian writer. His debut novel Chase and Haven was a shortlisted nominee for the amazon.ca First Novel Award in 2008 and won the ReLit Award for Best Novel in 2009 and Skin House won the same award in 2020, and his poetry collection Wore Down Trust won the Archibald Lampman Award in 2012. He has also been the recipient of the Lilian I. Found Award, and the Diana Brebner Award, and has served as adjudicator for the Canada Council for the Arts and the Ontario Arts Council. He is represented internationally by Hilary McMahon, Executive Vice President, Westwood Creative Artists.

Originally from Morrisburg, Ontario,[3] Blouin currently lives in Kemptville, Ontario.[3]

His 2019 novel Skin House won the 2020 ReLit Award for Best Novel.

It has also been included, as part of the Lunar Codex project, in the NASA/Astrobotic mission to the Moon in 2022 and, along with I am Billy the Kid, the NASA/Astrobotic/SpaceX lunar landings in 2023.
His upcoming books are Southbound, The Wonderful, and the hybrid memoir FADE.
As of March 2023 Blouin is an Instructor with the University of Toronto.

Works
I'm Not Going to Lie to You (2007)
Chase and Haven (2008)
Wore Down Trust (2011)
I Don't Know How to Behave (2013)
Skin House (2020)
I am Billy the Kid (2022)

References

External links
Michael Blouin

Year of birth missing (living people)
Canadian male novelists
21st-century Canadian novelists
21st-century Canadian poets
Writers from Ontario
Living people
Canadian male poets
21st-century Canadian male writers